Maskoor Ahmad Usmani is an Indian politician based in Darbhanga, Bihar. Usmani was the president of the Aligarh Muslim University Students' Union and is a national leader of the Indian National Congress. He holds a dentistry degree from Aligarh Muslim University. Usmani is better known for Citizenship Amendment Act protests and Citizenship (Amendment) Act, 2019 protests.

Early life and education 
Usmani was born in Garoul, a village Panchayat located in Darbhanga, in 1995. He completed his primary education from Garoul before entering Iqra Academy, Darbhanga. Usmani attended Kendriya Vidyalaya - 2, Darbhanga. Usmani participated in state level debates, science exhibitions and co-curricular activities while at school. He was also the school captain and scout and guide commander.

He then pursued a Bachelor in Dental Surgery from Aligarh Muslim University.

Political career

Aligarh Muslim University Student's Union 
In December 2017, Usmani defeated Ajay Singh by 6,719 votes and was elected as a president of the Aligarh Muslim University Students' Union. Usmani has been campaigned against Hindutva politics, which promotes a manifestation of Hindu Nationalism. In 2018, Usmani met with former vice-president of India Hamid Ansari at his residence to invite him at the Aligarh Muslim University Students' Union.

Anti CAA Movement 
In 2019, Usmani came into the limelight during the anti-CAA protest. He started campaigning against CAA-NRC, the 2019 amendment in Indian Citizenship Act. At that time he criticised the government and took part in several anti-CAA protests across India. During this period, he was invited as a TV panelist where he voiced his dissent against the newly passed CAA.

Bihar Assembly Elections- 2020 
Usmani was an INC candidate from the Jale (Vidhan Sabha constituency) which is part of No. 6 Madhubani (Lok Sabha constituency) in the 2020 Bihar Legislative Assembly election. INC is a coalition partner within the Mahagathbandhan (Bihar). He stood 2nd and managed to secure 65580 electoral votes.

Controversy
In 2018, local BJP MP Satish Gautam demanded the removal of Jinnah's portrait from the student union's office. During that time, Maskoor Ahmad Usmani was the president of the Aligarh Muslim University Students' Union. BJP accused Maskoor Ahmad Usmani for opposing the call to remove Jinnah's portrait from the student union's office. Oh his defense, Maskoor Ahmad Usmani released a statement, "We’d again like to make it very clear that the students of Aligarh Muslim University are in no way defending Mohammad Ali Jinnah or his portrait". Usmani wrote a letter to PM Narendra Modi requesting removal of all portraits of Jinnah across India, particularly pointing to Jinnah’s portrait within the Bombay High Court and the Parliament of India.

In 2019, Usmani was booked under sedition charges for raising anti-national slogans. According to Outlook India, 14 students had a noisy disturbance with Republic TV crew on an ongoing college meeting. AMU authority and Republic TV both lodged complaints at the Civil Lines Police Station. Later, sedition charges were dropped for Maskoor Ahmad Usmani, it was discovered, Usmani was in Delhi when the incident happened.

In 2020, Twitter suspended his official account for criticizing Unlawful Activities (Prevention) Act on arrest of Safoora Zargar and Meeran Haider.

References

Indian activists
Year of birth missing (living people)
Living people
Indian National Congress politicians from Bihar
People from Darbhanga
Aligarh Muslim University alumni
People involved in the Citizenship Amendment Act protests